Senator Carrigan may refer to:

James J. Carrigan (born 1941), Massachusetts State Senate
John E. Carrigan (1910–1984), West Virginia State Senate